Gastropacha sikkima is a moth in the  family Lasiocampidae. It is found in India (Darjeeling, Sikkim), northern Thailand, Laos and Taiwan.

References

Lasiocampidae
Moths described in 1879
Moths of Asia
Moths of Taiwan